Plac Zbawiciela or Saviour Square, is a circular city square and roundabout in central Warsaw, Poland.

The square was originally designed by 18th-century gardener and architect Johann Christian Schuch as part of the royal gardens.

Located toward the south end of Marszałkowska Street, near the Royal Baths Park, the square is named after the Church of the Holiest Saviour, which was built in 1901–27 and stands at the square's southern side. Following the Second World War, new colonnades were erected based on those at Piazza della Repubblica in Rome.

The square is intersected radially by three streets: Marszałkowska, Mokotowska and Nowowiejska–Aleja Wyzwolenia. Its center is a roundabout encircled by a ring of buildings containing shops, offices and residences, as well as the church.

The square was the setting and primary filming location for Krzysztof Krauze's 2006 film, Plac Zbawiciela.

The artistic installation Tęcza was installed here in summer 2012 which has been the subject of some controversy. In August 2015 the artistic installation was removed.

References

External links
 
 Plac Zbawiciela at the official website of Śródmieście district
 Aerial photo from maps.google.com

Zbawiciela
Tourist attractions in Warsaw
Śródmieście, Warsaw